Sush Machida Gaikotsu (Sush Machida, born in Maebashi, Japan), is a contemporary Japanese artist. He currently lives and works in Las Vegas, Nevada, U.S.A. His artwork has been exhibited internationally. Machida received his M.F.A. (2002) from the University of Nevada, Las Vegas. He is represented by Western Project, Los Angeles, among others.

Artwork 
Los Angeles Times art critic David Pagel wrote "It's a rare instance of less-is-more magic, when a strictly limited number of judicious decisions intensifies the effect of the whole. Pop art never looked more scorchingly gorgeous or wickedly Zen."

Books
Douglas Bullis. 100 Artists of the West Coast, Schiffer Publishing,  Atglen, Pennsylvania 
702 Series, Sush Machida Gaikotsu, Las Vegas Art Museum Press

References

External links
sushmachida.com
Western Project, Los Angeles
CMHinterview with Sush Machida, April 2009

1973 births
Living people
Japanese artists
People from Maebashi
University of Nevada, Las Vegas alumni
People from the Las Vegas Valley
Japanese expatriates in the United States